Ministry of Community and Social Services (Ontario) in Canada
Ministry of Community Development, Gender and Children in Tanzania
Ministry of Community Development, Youth and Sports in China
Ministry of Community Safety and Correctional Services in Canada